The Mulholland League is a high school athletic league that is part of the CIF Southern Section. Members are charter and independent schools located in and around Los Angeles.

Members
 Ánimo Leadership Charter High School
 Environmental Charter High School
 Los Angeles Adventist Academy 
 Pacific Lutheran High School 
 Shalhevet High School
 Summit View West School (West Side)
 Ambassador High School

Pcifix Lutheran High School
Vistamar High school

References

CIF Southern Section leagues